Constitutional Assembly elections were held in El Salvador on 28 March 1982. The Christian Democratic Party won a plurality, with 24 of the 60 seats. Voter turnout was 68.0%. A coalition government, representing the three largest parties equally, was subsequently formed under the presidency of Álvaro Magaña.

Results

References

Legislative elections in El Salvador
1982 in El Salvador
El Salvador